The second generation of the Ford F-Series is a series of trucks that was produced by Ford from the 1953 to 1956 model years.  In line with the previous generation, the F-Series encompassed a wide range of vehicles, ranging from light-duty pickup trucks to heavy-duty commercial vehicles.  In place of the previous "Bonus-Built" series, Ford now marketed its truck range as the "Triple Economy" series.  

To further emphasize the model update, Ford changed the F-Series model nomenclature from a single number to three numbers; subsequently, this system has remained in use on all Ford F-Series trucks to the present day.   

Alongside the naming change, this generation marked several firsts for the F-Series, including an adjustable seat (wide enough for 3 people), power brakes, and the introduction of the Ford-O-Matic automatic transmission as an option.  In line with Ford cars, seat belts were introduced as an option for 1956.    

The second-generation F-Series was produced by Ford at eleven facilities across the United States; Ford Canada marketed the model line under both the F-Series and the Mercury M-Series nameplates.  Ford of Brazil inaugurated local production with the model line, producing it from 1957 to 1962.

Model overview

1956 update 
The 1956 F-100 is a one-year only body style. The 1956 F-100 is easily identified as it has vertical windshield pillars and a wrap around windshield as opposed to the sloped pillars and angled windshield of the 1953-55. The 1956 model also offered a larger wraparound back window as an option.

Powertrain details
The 1954 F-100 was the last year for the flathead engine in the US. Models in Canada, however, (Mercury M-Series), retained the flathead. 1954-55 saw the introduction of the new 239 CID overhead valve Y-block V8, dubbed "Power King." The six-cylinder engine's displacement was also increased from 215 to 223 CID and power steering was introduced as an option.  In the succeeding years the 239 Y-block was replaced with the 256, 272 and 312.

Models
As part of the model change from the first generation, the model nomenclature for the F-Series was changed from a single number denoting each model series to a three-digit model number.  As of current production, this nomenclature remains in use today, under minor revisions (the F-150 replaced the F-100 entirely; many medium-duty trucks use the F-x50 designation).    

Among the pickup truck lines, the -ton F-1 became the F-100, the F-2 and F-3 were consolidated into the -ton F-250, with the F-4 becoming the 1-ton F-350.  For 1956, lower GVWR versions of the F-100 and the F-250 were introduced (under the F-110 and F-260 model codes).   

The medium-duty F-5 (-ton) and F-6 (2-ton) became the F-500 and F-600, respectively.  The heavy-duty F-7, F-8, and F-9 "Big Job" trucks became the F-700, F-750, F-800, and F-900 series.

Gallery

References

2nd generation
Pickup trucks
Rear-wheel-drive vehicles
All-wheel-drive vehicles
Motor vehicles manufactured in the United States
Cars introduced in 1952
1960s cars
Vans
Panel trucks